Alogonia perissalis is species of moth in the family Erebidae. It is the only species in the monotypic genus Alogonia. A. perissalis is known from Suriname, Montserrat and Trinidad. Both the genus and the species were first described by Schaus in 1916.

References

Hypeninae